Gyöngyösi Farkasok RK is a Hungarian rugby club based in Mátrafüred in Gyöngyös. They currently play in Nemzeti Bajnokság II.

History
The club was founded in 1991.

Current squad

External links
  Gyöngyösi Farkasok RK

Hungarian rugby union teams
Rugby clubs established in 1991
1991 establishments in Hungary